Craig Cohon is a London-based, Canadian businessman known for his role in bringing both Coca-Cola and Cirque du Soleil to Russia. A University of Western Ontario graduate and Advisory Board member, Cohon is also known for his work in the early 2000s in international development and London community building and for the last decade deeply involved in the nighttime entertainment business in Moscow and recently in London.

Early life
Cohon was born at Michael Reese Hospital in the South Side of Chicago, the eldest of two children of Susan Silver Cohon (Born 1938), a philanthropist, and George Cohon (Born 1937), a former lawyer and Founder of McDonald's in Canada and Russia. His grandparents on both sides emigrated from Ukraine, Russia, Lithuania, and Latvia.

Cohon moved with his parents and younger brother Mark to Toronto, Ontario, Canada in 1968 when he was five years old. He attended Upper Canada College where he excelled in rugby and also took up the saxophone which he plays to this day. Cohon went on to graduate from the economics and music faculty at The University of Western Ontario where he was heavily involved in student politics, was the Business Editor of the University newspaper, worked at the campus radio station and started a TV station on campus – playing in a band, throughout. Cohon also created the first Annual Western Charity Ball (1984) with Alan Thicke that continues to this day, raising millions of dollars for local London and Canadian charities.

Cohon got the travel bug in 1985 and has worked and traveled to 97 countries but calls London home and has lived there since 1999. As well as spending 15 years in Canada, Cohon has also spent 12 in the US, five years in Russia, two years in Sweden, two years in Norway and three months each in India, South Africa, Chile and Venezuela.

Post university, Cohon became one of the first Canadian venturers for the UK charity Operation Raleigh and participated in Operation 5C in 1985 to Southern Chile. He helped to build a school in Puerto Montt and completed a road survey on horseback for the extension of the Pan American Highway (which has now been built).

Corporate career
He came out of the jungle in May 1986, saw a Coca-Cola sign on a hut and went on to work for the company for 14 years. Cohon quickly grew through the ranks within Coca-Cola USA from 1986–1991. He was given the Miami territory and he started selling Coca-Cola to mom and pop restaurants from a banana-coloured station wagon and after two years had become one of the top salesmen in the country. Cohon was soon promoted to the company's headquarters in Atlanta and went on to train hundreds of Coca-Cola salespeople across the United States.

Two months after the opening of the Soviet Union's first McDonald's restaurant in Moscow in early 1991, his future mentor Donald Keough, President and CEO of the Coca-Cola Company worldwide, appointed Cohon as the company's first employee in the Soviet Union. He spent six months living in the communist party hotel Octoberskya 2 in Moscow where he learned to speak fluent Russian, worked at the local Soviet beverage factory, rode trucks, and traveled to every metro station in the city, convincing the leadership of Coca-Cola to invest in Russia. From age 27 to 31 he launched the brand to the Russians and led the construction of Coca-Cola's first factory in the former Soviet Union. Cohon and his friends and family were hosted by President Gorbachev at his 30th birthday party. He was often followed by the KGB and went public on Russian radio with tapes after the collapse of the Soviet Union. Just prior to the first Soviet Coca-Cola plant opening, a rocket-propelled hand grenade was launched at his office early one morning in October 1993, luckily causing little damage.

Cohon was eventually promoted to European Division Marketing Director and moved to Oslo, running the marketing for 15 countries in Northern Europe and the former Soviet Union. He then moved to Atlanta for four years where he was responsible for Brand Coca-Cola worldwide, including its activation at the 1996 Atlanta Olympic Games.

After his extended tenure, he chose to jump off the traditional corporate career path and spend three years as Director of Learning Strategy for the Coca-Cola European Group.

Cohon moved to London in 1999 and was promoted to be Deputy Division President of The Northwest Europe Division.

Cohon was nominated to the Class of 1999 Global Leaders for Tomorrow at the World Economic Forum. It was in the midst of the anti-globalisation movement and after attending Davos and hearing former American President Clinton speak about the need to evolve capitalism to make it more equitable for all, he decided to leave The Coca-Cola Company and left a substantial amount of stock options on the table to pursue a more purposeful life and career.

He went on to work for Klaus Schwab, Founder of the World Economic Forum for six months, deeply engaging in the world of international organisations, understanding the world of Global NGOs and pushing the corporate social responsibility agenda. Perceiving the challenge of making a personal impact on global issues, in 2001 he founded Globalegacy and focused his efforts on making an impact in London's urban communities.

After teaching at the London Business School for a summer, he hired 10 students and began to craft a vision for Globalegacy. Cohon focused his efforts on East London and quickly moved into an office container near Bromley-By-Bow. He worked closely with local government authorities the LDA, Bromley-by-Bow Centre and Leaside Regeneration to begin to craft a local development strategy that worked for all prior to the awarding of the 2012 Olympic Games.

Cohon then decided to take his expertise back internationally. He teamed up with city development expert Jeb Brugmann and global business guru, CK Prahalad, author of Fortune at The Bottom of the Pyramid to own and lead an international development strategic advisory firm. Together they helped create and support two businesses for people in poverty. One started with BP, now called First Energy, is a provider of clean energy stoves for businesses and kitchens throughout India. The other, RML, was an early stage tech company incubated with Reuters.

Honours, Awards and Boards
In 1993, Cohon received an Honorary Doctorate of Economics from Moscow International University. In 2000, the World Economic Forum named him "A Global Leader for Tomorrow." He was awarded the 2003 Young Alumni Award from the University of Western Ontario and now sits on their Global Advisory Board. Cohon is an active supporter of London's soon-to-be-built Garden Bridge project. As well, he gives time to many local charities in London. 
Cohon was one of the first sponsors of London's Ethical Fashion Forum's RE Fashion in 2008.

He is also Chairman of Worn Again since 2007, a technology innovation company in development of a circular textile to textile recycling technology and working closely with H & M.

Cohon decided to combine his international business experience and his love of Russia to delve into another business: entertainment. Partnering with Guy Laliberte, owner of the world's largest live entertainment company, Cohon brought Cirque du Soleil to Russia, acting as Vice Chairman of Cirque du Soleil Russia. Since 2009 he has helped transform the live entertainment business across the country, bringing 11 highly acclaimed international shows to 14 Russian cities which have been seen by 2.3 million people. Cohon spearheaded over US$120 million investment into the sector and has worked with 40 local Russian and International partners. He also led the implementation of Russia's first electronic ticketing system that provides security, best pricing and freedom of choice to millions of Russians. Cohon's Russian partner is currently finalising plans to build a US$50 million theatre to house future Cirque du Soleil shows in Moscow.

Personal life
Cohon lives on a barge called Ocean on the River Thames with his teenage son and daughter. Cohon was divorced in 2010 from Dr. Jeanette Sundberg-Cohon after an 18 year relationship.

Cohon is an avid international traveller. He does not own a car and travels throughout London by foot, boat, bike and public transport.

References

Canadian businesspeople
Living people
University of Western Ontario alumni
Place of birth missing (living people)
1963 births
Jewish Canadian philanthropists